Wallowa County is the northeastern most county in the U.S. state of Oregon. As of the 2020 census, the population was 7,391, making it Oregon's fifth-least populous county. Its county seat is Enterprise. According to Oregon Geographic Names, the origins of the county's name are uncertain, with the most likely explanation being it is derived from the Nez Perce term for a structure of stakes (a weir) used in fishing. An alternative explanation is that Wallowa is derived from a Nez Perce word for "winding water". The journals of Lewis and Clark Expedition record the name of the Wallowa River as Wil-le-wah.

Wallowa County is part of the eight-county definition of Eastern Oregon.

History
In 1871, the first white settlers came to the area, crossing the mountains in search of livestock feed in the Wallowa Valley. The county was established on February 11, 1887, from the eastern portion of Union County. Boundary changes occurred with Union County in 1890, 1900, and 1915.

In 1877, the younger Chief Joseph of the Nez Perce, incensed at the government's attempt to remove his people from the Wallowa Valley, refused to relocate to the reservation in north central Idaho. Several regiments of U.S. Army cavalry troops were dispatched to force them onto the reservation. After numerous battles and a journey of almost two thousand miles  (3,200 km), the Nez Perce fought their last battle at Bear Paw, just shy of the Canadian border, when Joseph and the other chiefs decided to stop fighting. He and some of the surviving Nez Perce  were held in prison camps in Kansas and Oklahoma, and those who survived that were relocated to Colville Reservation in northeast Washington. Approximately half of the survivors moved to the Nez Perce Reservation in Idaho. Chief Joseph last visited Wallowa County in 1902, and died two years later.

Wallowa County was the scene of perhaps the worst incident of violence against Chinese in Oregon, when in May 1887 a gang of rustlers massacred 10-34 Chinese gold miners in Hells Canyon. Of the seven rustlers and schoolboys believed to have been responsible, only three were brought to trial in Enterprise, where a jury found them not guilty on September 1, 1888. A proposal to commemorate this event on official maps as Chinese Massacre Cove was approved in 2005 and encompasses a five-acre site.

In 1896, the Joseph town bank was robbed and there was a shootout in the streets.  The town has occasionally had re-enactments of that event.

Wallowa County Courthouse was built in 1909–1910, using locally quarried Bowlby stone, a type of volcanic tuff. It is a Romanesque Revival-style building with Queen Anne architectural elements in some exterior features. The courthouse was listed on National Register of Historic Places in 2000. The square is landscaped with oak, pine, maple, linden, juniper, and flowering crab apple trees. There are roses planted on the north, west, and south sides of the courthouse. The square also has several veteran memorials along with a  wood-framed gazebo in the northeast corner of the square.

United States Supreme Court Associate Justice William O. Douglas was one famous summer visitor to Wallowa County, building a vacation cabin on Lostine River Road in 1939.

In December 2003, a developer announced a proposal to buy a  property near Wallowa Lake, and build 11 homes on it. This property is adjacent to the property that is home to the grave of Old Chief Joseph, father of the younger Chief Joseph. This proposal drew opposition from a local group, as well as from the Nez Perce, Colville, and Umatilla tribes. Prior offers by the National Park Service and the Trust for Public Land to buy the land were rejected. The County commissioners gave conditional approval for the developers to complete a final plat of the land on February 13, 2004, but the attorney for the Nez Perce said the tribe would appeal the decision to the Oregon Land Use Board of Appeals.  As of 2016, the controversy was still active.

Geography

Wallowa is the northeasternmost county of Oregon.

Geographic features
Wallowa Lake and the Wallowa Mountains attract tourists to this region. The lake is a natural glacial formation, held in on three sides by prominent moraines.  The microclimate is somewhat different from the surrounding areas and provides a cool retreat during the summer. Other geographic features include:

 Grande Ronde River
 Joseph Canyon
 Hells Canyon
 Wallowa River

Adjacent counties
 Columbia County, Washington - northwest
 Garfield County, Washington - north
 Asotin County, Washington - northeast
 Nez Perce County, Idaho - northeast
 Idaho County, Idaho - east/Mountain Time Border
 Adams County, Idaho - southeast/Mountain Time Border
 Baker County (south)
 Union County (southwest)
 Umatilla County (west)

National protected areas
 Nez Perce National Historical Park (part)
 Umatilla National Forest (part)
 Wallowa–Whitman National Forest (part)
 Hells Canyon National Recreation Area (part)

Demographics

2000 census
At the 2000 census there were 7,226 people, 3,029 households, and 2,083 families residing in the county.  The population density was 2 people per square mile (1/km2).  There were 3,900 housing units at an average density of 1 per square mile (0/km2).  The racial makup of the county was 96.50% White, 0.03% Black or African American, 0.71% Native American, 0.24% Asian, 0.04% Pacific Islander, 0.95% from other races, and 1.54% from two or more races.  1.73%. were Hispanic or Latino of any race. 21.8% were of German, 15.7% American, 12.3% English and 11.8% Irish ancestry.

Of the 3,029 households 28.50% had children under the age of 18 living with them, 58.70% were married couples living together, 6.90% had a female householder with no husband present, and 31.20% were non-families. 27.10% of households were one person and 11.90% were one person aged 65 or older.  The average household size was 2.35 and the average family size was 2.85.

The age distribution was 24.30% under the age of 18, 4.90% from 18 to 24, 21.90% from 25 to 44, 30.00% from 45 to 64, and 18.90% 65 or older.  The median age was 44 years. For every 100 females there were 100.10 males.  For every 100 females age 18 and over, there were 96.10 males.

The median household income was $32,129 and the median family income was $38,682. Males had a median income of $28,202 versus $21,558 for females. The per capita income for the county was $17,276.  About 9.80% of families and 14.00% of the population were below the poverty line, including 18.30% of those under age 18 and 11.40% of those age 65 or over.

2010 census
As of the 2010 census, there were 7,008 people, 3,133 households, and 2,024 families residing in the county. The racial makeup of the county was 96.0% white, 0.6% American Indian, 0.4% black or African American, 0.3% Asian, 0.1% Pacific islander, 0.5% from other races, and 2.0% from two or more races. Those of Hispanic or Latino origin made up 2.2% of the population. In terms of ancestry, 28.4% were German, 16.7% were English, 14.6% were Irish, 7.3% were American, and 5.4% were Scotch-Irish.

Of the 3,133 households, 22.3% had children under the age of 18 living with them, 54.3% were married couples living together, 7.1% had a female householder with no husband present, 35.4% were non-families, and 30.0% of households were made up of individuals. The average household size was 2.20 and the average family size was 2.70. The median age was 50.5 years.

The median income for a household in the county was $41,116 and the median family income was $49,961. Males had a median income of $35,963 versus $29,395 for females. The per capita income for the county was $23,023. About 9.6% of families and 12.9% of the population were below the poverty line, including 17.4% of those under age 18 and 10.6% of those age 65 or over.

Communities

Incorporated cities
Enterprise (county seat)
Joseph
Lostine
Wallowa

Census-designated place
Wallowa Lake

Unincorporated communities

Bartlett
Eden
Evans
Flora
Fruita

Grouse
Imnaha
Lewis
Maxville
Minam

Paradise
Promise
Troy
Zumwalt

Politics

State Legislature
Wallowa County is located in Oregon State House District 58 which is currently represented by Bobby Levy. It is also located in Oregon State Senate District 29, represented by Bill Hansell. Both Levy and Hansell are registered Republicans.

Board of Commissioners
Wallowa County is represented and governed by three County Commissioners. The Wallowa County Board of Commissioners is currently made up of Susan Roberts, Todd Nash and John Hillock.  Susan Roberts is a former Mayor of Enterprise and was elected onto the Board of Commissioners in 2008. Todd Nash was elected in 2016. John Hillock was elected in 2019. The seats are nonpartisan, although all three commissioners are registered Republicans.

Make-up of voters
Like most counties in eastern Oregon, the majority of registered voters who are part of a political party in Wallowa County are members of the Republican Party. In the 2008 presidential election, 63.52% of Wallowa County voters voted for Republican John McCain, while 33.42% voted for Democrat Barack Obama and 3.06% of voters either voted for a Third Party candidate or wrote in a candidate. These numbers have changed slightly from the 2004 presidential election, in which 69.3% voted for George W. Bush, while 28.1% voted for John Kerry, and 2.6% of voters either voted for a Third Party candidate or wrote in a candidate.

Economy
The principal industries in Wallowa County are agriculture, ranching, lumber, and tourism. Since 1985, three bronze foundries and a number of related businesses specializing in statue-making have opened in Joseph and Enterprise, helping to stabilize the local economy. The Forest Service is the largest landlord in the county, owning 56% of the land.

Transportation

Major highways
  – Oregon Route 3 – north to Washington, becomes  Route 129
  – Oregon Route 82 – west to La Grande, the junction with  Interstate 84

Railroads
 Eagle Cap Excursion Train (part)

Notable people

 Chief Joseph
 Margaret Osborne duPont
 Walter Brennan

 Eugene Pallette
 Amos Marsh
 Frank Wayne Marsh

See also
National Register of Historic Places listings in Wallowa County, Oregon

Notes

References

External links

 
 Wallowa County Chamber of Commerce

 
Oregon placenames of Native American origin
1887 establishments in Oregon
Populated places established in 1887